Euxoa churchillensis is a moth of the family Noctuidae. It is found from Ontario, Nunavut, the Northern Territories and Manitoba in Canada, south in the Rocky Mountains to Colorado.

External links
Species info
Moths of Rocky Mountain National Park

Euxoa
Moths of North America
Insects of the Arctic
Moths described in 1932